Lanxess AG is a German specialty chemicals company based in Cologne, Germany that was founded in 2004, via the spin-off of the chemicals division and parts of the polymers business from Bayer AG.

History 
The roots of the company go back to 1863, the year Bayer AG was founded. In November 2003, as part of a major restructuring, the Bayer Group decided to spin off large parts of its chemical activities and around a third of its polymer business into an independent company. 

On 1 July 2004 Lanxess positioned itself internally in the new structures. In November 2004, the Extraordinary General Meeting of Bayer AG took place in Essen. Over 99 percent of the capital present voted for Lanxess to be spun off from Bayer.

Shares in Lanxess AG were listed in Germany’s DAX from 24 September 2012 to 21 September 2015, and form part of MDAX, a midcap index. The company is listed in the Dow Jones Sustainability Index and FTSE4Good Index.

In 2016, the company began to focus on the market for additives for lubricants and fire retardants by acquiring Chemtura and placing its rubber business into a joint venture with Aramco.

In February 2020, Lanxess acquired Brazilian biocide manufacturer Itibanyl Produtos Especiais Ltda. (IPEL).

In July 2022, Lanxess completed its acquisition of International Flavors & Fragrances' microbial control unit for US$1.3 billion.

Notes

External links

Chemical companies of Germany
Companies listed on the Frankfurt Stock Exchange
Chemical companies established in 2004
German brands
Manufacturing companies based in Cologne
Multinational companies headquartered in Germany
2004 establishments in Germany
Corporate spin-offs
Former Bayer subsidiaries
Companies in the MDAX